Shiban (Sheiban) or Shayban (Shiban, also spelled Siban) was a prince of the early Golden Horde. He was a grandson of Genghis Khan, the fifth son of Jochi and a younger brother of Batu Khan who founded the Golden Horde. His descendants were the Shaybanids who became important about two centuries later.

Mongol invasion of Europe

Shiban participated the Mongol invasion of Europe and made a decisive attack on the army of Béla IV at the Battle of Mohi in 1241.

Territorial grants by the Golden Horde
Because he had not reached his majority when his father died in 1227, he did not receive any lands at that time. Abulghazi says that after this campaign, Batu gave Shiban lands east of the Ural Mountains on the lower parts of the Syr Darya, Chu River, and Sary su Rivers as winter quarters and the lands of the Ural River flowing off the east side of the Urals, as summer quarters. Shiban was also given 15,000 families as a gift from his brother Orda Khan, as well as the four Uruks of the Kuchis, the Naimans, the Karluks, and the Buiruks, while he assigned him as a camping ground all the country lying between that of his brother Orda Ichin and his own. Thus Shiban's lands were somewhat between Batu's and Orda's and between the Ural mountains and the Caspian Sea.

Descendants
Although it is unknown how long he lived, his descendants continued to rule long after the breakup of the Ulus of Jochi (Golden Horde). It is merely said that he left twelve sons, namely Bainal or Yasal, Behadur, Kadak, Balagha, Cherik or Jerik, Mergen or Surkhan, Kurtugha or 
Kultuka, Ayachi or Abaji, Sailghan or Sasiltan, Beyanjar or Bayakachar, 
Majar, and Kunchi or Kuwinji. Shiban's descendants are known as the Shaybanids; his male line continues down to the present time. 

One of Shiban's sons, Balagha Bey (Prince Balagha) assisted Hulagu Khan in taking Baghdad in 1258. However, he died in unknown circumstances. According to William of Rubruck, he killed his cousin Güyük Khan in a violent brawl.

A number of Shiban's descendants ascended the throne of the Golden Horde after the extinction of the line of Batu in 1359, including the thrones of the Golden Horde's successor states, like the Khanate of Sibir and the Uzbek Khanate. Two sets of Shiban's descendants established themselves in Central Asia, founding the Khanates of Transoxiana (later Bukhara) and Khwarazm (later Khiva). 

The following is a simplified line of descent to these rulers; generations start with Shiban (as 0); "Grey Horde" (following information in Ötemiš-Ḥājjī) designates the Ulus of Shiban in Bashkiria, but both the designation and the succession are somewhat tentative. For the sake of accuracy and consistency, the names, which are found in a bewildering and inconsistent number of variations, are given below in the Perso-Arabic orthography of the major genealogical sources, the Muʿizz al-ansāb and the Tawārīḫ-i guzīdah-i nuṣrat-nāmah, in the standard scholarly transcription used in English-language scholarship (e.g., Bosworth 1996).

0 Shiban, 1st khan of the Grey Horde (d. 1248)
 1 Bahadur, 2nd khan of the Grey Horde (d. c. 1280)
 2 Jochi-Buqa, 3rd khan of the Grey Horde (d. c. 1310)
 3 Bada-Qul, 4th khan of the Grey Horde
 4 Ming-Timur, 5th khan of the Grey Horde
 5 Pūlād (Khayr-Pūlād), 6th khan of the Grey Horde, later Golden Horde 1362-1365
 6 Ibrāhīm, 7th khan of the Grey Horde
 7 Khiḍr, 1st Uzbek khan and Sibir 1428-1429
 7 Dawlat-Shaykh
 8 Abu'l-Khayr, 2nd Uzbek khan 1429-1469; of Sibir 1429-1431; of Khwarazm 1462-1464
 9 Shāh-Būdāq
 10 Shāh-Bakht Muḥammad (Muḥammad Shaybānī), 1st Shaybanid khan of Transoxiana 1500-1510
 11 Khurram-Shāh of Balkh (d. 1511)
 11 Suyūnch-Muḥammad 
 12 Yār-Muḥammad of Bukhara (d. 1554)
 11 Muḥammad-Tīmūr of Samarqand (d. 1514)
 10 Maḥmūd-Shāh
 11 ʿUbaydallāh, 4th khan of Transoxiana 1533-1540
 12 ʿAbd al-ʿAzīz of Bukhara, 7th khan of Khwarazm 1539-1540 (d. 1549)
 12 Muḥammad-Raḥīm
 13 Burkhān-Sulṭān of Bukhara (d. 1557)
 9 Shaykh-Ḥaydar, 4th Uzbek khan 1472-1473
 10 Khush-Ḥaydar, 5th Uzbek khan 1473
 9 Sayyid-Bābā, 6th Uzbek khan 1473-1480
 9 Kūchkūnchī-Muḥammad, 2nd khan of Transoxiana 1512-1530
 10 Abū-Saʿīd, 3rd khan of Transoxiana 1530-1533
 11 Sulṭān-Saʿīd of Samarqand (d. 1572)
 11 Jawānmard-ʿAlī of Samarqand (d. 1578)
 12 Abu'l-Khayr of Samarqand (d. 1578)
 10 ʿAbdallāh I, 5th khan of Transoxiana 1540
 10 ʿAbd al-Laṭīf, 6th khan of Transoxiana 1540-1552
 11 Muḥammad-Ibrāhīm (Gadāy) of Samarqand (d. after 1568)
 9 Suyūnchuk-Khwājah of Tashkent (d. 1525)
 10 Kīldī-Muḥammad of Tashkent (d. 1532)
 10 Nawrūz-Aḥmad (Barāq), 7th khan of Transoxiana 1552-1556
 11 Darwīsh of Tashkent (d. 1578)
 11 Bābā-Sulṭān of Samarqand and Tashkent (d. 1582)
 9 Khwājah-Muḥammad
 10 Jānī-Beg
 11 Kīstan-Qarā of Balkh (d. 1544)
 12 Qīlīch-Qarā of Balkh (d. after 1546)
 11 Pīr-Muḥammad I, 8th khan of Transoxiana 1556-1561 (d. 1567)
 12 Dīn-Muḥammad of Balkh (d. 1578)
 11 Iskandar, 9th khan of Transoxiana 1561-1583
 12 ʿAbdallāh II, 10th khan of Transoxiana 1583-1598
 13 ʿAbd al-Muʾmin, 11th khan of Transoxiana 1598
 12 ʿIbād-Allāh of Samarqand (d. 1585)
 13 Yādigār of Samarqand (d. by 1598)
 13 ʿAbd al-Amīn of Balkh (d. 1600)
 12 Dūst-Muḥammad (Dūstūm) of Tashkent (d. 1586)
 12 Zihr-bānū Begum, married Jānī-Muḥammad b. Yār-Muḥammad, Ashtarkhanid khan of Transoxiana 1600-1603
 11 Rustam
 12 Ūz-Beg of Tashkent (d. 1598)
 13 Khazārā (d. 1598)
 11 Sulaymān
 12 Pīr-Muḥammad II, 12th khan of Transoxiana 1598-1599
 12 Maḥmūd-Sulṭān
 13 ʿUbaydallāh of Balkh (d. 1605)
 10 Būbāy
 11 Kipak
 12 Muḥammad-Ibrāhīm of Balkh (d. 1601)
 12 Sayyid-Muḥammad
 13 Sayyid-Jahāngīr of Tashkent (d. after 1601)
 6 ʿArab-Shāh, 8th khan of the Grey Horde, later Golden Horde (d. after 1380)
 7 Tūqluq-Ḥājjī, 9th khan of the Grey Horde
 8 Tīmūr-Shaykh
 9 Yādigār, 3rd Uzbek khan 1469-1472
 10 Barkā (d. c. 1482)
 11 Īlbārs I, 1st Shaybanid khan of Khwarazm 1512-1518
 10 Balbārs
 11 Sulṭān-Ḥājjī, 2nd khan of Khwarazm 1518-1519
 10 Abūlaq
 11 Ḥasan-Qulī (Ḥusayn-Qulī), 3rd khan of Khwarazm 1519-1524
 10 Amīnaq
 11 Ṣufiyān, 4th khan of Khwarazm 1524-1535
 12 Yūnus, 11th khan of Khwarazm 1556-1557
 11 Buchugha, 5th khan of Khwarazm 1535-1537
 12 Dūst-Muḥammad, 12th khan of Khwarazm 1557-1558
 11 Awānish, 6th khan of Khwarazm 1537-1539
 12 Dīn-Muḥammad, 8th khan of Khwarazm 1540
 11 Qāl, 9th khan of Khwarazm 1540-1549
 11 Aqāṭāy, 10th khan of Khwarazm 1549-1556
 12 Ḥājjī-Muḥammad I, 13th khan of Khwarazm 1558-1592, 1593-1595, 1598-1602
 13 ʿArab-Muḥammad, 14th khan of Khwarazm 1602-1621 (d. 1622)
 14 Ḥabash, 15th (co-)khan of Khwarazm 1621-1623 (at Urgench)
 14 Īlbārs II, 15th (co-)khan of Khwarazm 1621-1623 (at Khiva)
 14 Isfandiyār, 16th khan of Khwarazm 1623-1642
 14 Abū'l-Ghāzī I, 17th khan of Khwarazm 1642-1663 (d. 1664)
 15 Anūshā-Muḥammad, 18th khan of Khwarazm 1663-1685
 16 Khudādād, 19th khan of Khwarazm 1685-1688
 16 Muḥammad-Ārang, 20th khan of Khwarazm 1688-1690 (the descent of the 21st-33rd khans is unclear)
 16 Yādigār-Muḥammad, 34th khan of Khwarazm 1712-1713 (d. 1714) (the descent of subsequent khans is unclear)
 12 Pūlād
 13 Bābā-Sulṭān (d. 1595)
 10 Abūqāy (d. c. 1535)
 11 Ismāʿīl (d. 1545)
 5 Beg-Qundī
 6 Ḥasan-Beg of the Golden Horde 1368-1369 (d. after 1376)
 6 ʿAlī
 7 Ḥājjī-Muḥammad of Sibir 1419-1421, of the Golden Horde 1419-1423
 8 Maḥmūd (Maḥmūdāq) of Sibir 1431-1464
 9 Ibrāhīm (Ibāq) of Sibir by 1473-1495
 10 Kūlūk-Sulṭān of Sibir 1502-1511
 11 Jagīr of Sibir 1511-by 1530
 11 Murtaḍā
 12 Aḥmad Girāy of Sibir 1563
 12 Qūchūm of Sibir 1563-1598 (d. 1600)
 13 ʿAlī of Sibir 1598-1608 (d. 1647)
 14 Arslān of Kasimov 1614-1627, married Fāṭima-Sulṭān of Kasimov 1679-1681
 15 Sayyid-Burhān of Kasimov 1627-1679
 13 Īsh-Muḥammad (Īshīm) of Sibir 1608-1625
 14 Abūlī Girāy of Sibir 1625-1636 (d. 1650)
 13 Chuwāq
 14 Dawlat Girāy of Sibir 1636-1659
 9 Muḥammad (Mamūq) of Sibir 1495-1497; Kazan 1495-1496 (d. 1502)
 10 Aghlāq of Sibir 1497-1502
 8 Sayyid-Aḥmad (Sayyidāq) of Sibir 1464-after 1468
 5 Īl-Beg of the Golden Horde 1373-1374
 6 Qāghān-Beg of the Golden Horde 1375-1377 (d. after 1380)
 7 Maḥmūd-Khwāja of Sibir and the Golden Horde 1428-1430
 5 Suyūnch-Tīmūr
 6 Suyūnch-Bāy
 7 Bābā
 8 Ṣūfī
 9 Jūmādaq of Sibir 1426-1428
 1 Salghan
 2 Qutluq-Tīmūr
 3 Būrāldāy
 4 Balīq 
 5 Tūn-Khwāja
 6 ʿAzīz-Shaykh of the Golden Horde 1364-1367
 1 Qadaq
 2 Töle-Buqa
 3 Mangqutai
 4 Khiḍr Khan of the Golden Horde 1360-1361
 5 Tīmūr-Khwāja of the Golden Horde 1361
 4 Murād of the Golden Horde 1361-1363

See also
 Khanate of Sibir
 Muhammad Shaybani
 Shaybanids

Notes

References
 Bosworth, C. E., The New Islamic Dynasties, New York, 1996.
 Bregel, Y. (transl.), Firdaws al-Iqbāl: History of Khorezm by Shir Muhammad Mirab Munis and Muhammad Riza Mirab Agahi, Leiden, 1999.
 Desmaisons, P. I. (transl.), Histoire des Mongols et des Tatares par Aboul-Ghâzi Béhâdour Khân, St Petersburg, 1871-1874.
 Gaev, A. G., "Genealogija i hronologija Džučidov," Numizmatičeskij sbornik 3 (2002) 9-55.
 Grousset, R. The Empire of the Steppes, New Brunswick, New Jersey: Rutgers University Press, 1970 (translated by Naomi Walford from the French edition  published by Payot, 1970), pp. 478–490 et passim.
 Howorth, H. H., History of the Mongols from the 9th to the 19th Century. Part II.1, II.2. London, 1880.
 Judin, V. P., Utemiš-hadži, Čingiz-name, Alma-Ata, 1992.
 Sabitov, Ž. M., Genealogija "Tore", Astana, 2008.
 Sagdeeva, R. Z., Serebrjannye monety hanov Zolotoj Ordy, Moscow, 2005.
 Tizengauzen, V. G. (trans.), Sbornik materialov, otnosjaščihsja k istorii Zolotoj Ordy. Izvlečenija iz arabskih sočinenii, republished as Istorija Kazahstana v arabskih istočnikah. 1. Almaty, 2005.
 Tizengauzen, V. G. (trans.), Sbornik materialov otnosjaščihsja k istorii Zolotoj Ordy. Izvlečenija iz persidskih sočinenii, republished as Istorija Kazahstana v persidskih istočnikah. 4. Almaty, 2006.
 Vohidov, Š. H. (trans.), Istorija Kazahstana v persidskih istočnikah. 3. Muʿizz al-ansāb. Almaty, 2006.

Mongol Empire people
Golden Horde
Nomadic groups in Eurasia
Borjigin